Eustalomyia festiva is a species of root-maggot fly in the family Anthomyiidae.

References 

Anthomyiidae
Insects described in 1845